Ensign Peak Advisors (EP) is the investment manager for assets of the Church of Jesus Christ of Latter-day Saints (LDS Church).
 
In 1997, the investment division of the LDS Church was spun off into a separate legal entity named after Ensign Peak, a hill that overlooks Salt Lake City. As of February 2020, Roger Clarke is EP's Chief Executive Officer. Gérald Caussé is the church's Presiding Bishop who oversees church finances, including EP.

History
After years of financial challenges, LDS Church leader N. Eldon Tanner established a practice in the 1960s of setting aside money from contributions each year for a rainy-day fund. EP was incorporated as a non-profit corporation on 29 September 1997. EP's holdings purportedly represents, in part, this rainy-day fund. United States Senator Mitt Romney was quoted as saying, "Happy that they've not only saved for a rainy day, but for a rainy decade." The investment division started with three employees and by the late 1970s reportedly managed $1billion.  As of February 2020, EP employs about 70 people, and all employees must maintain good standing in the LDS Church.

In a 2019 press release, the LDS Church explained the use of donations by members, "The vast majority of these funds are used immediately to meet the needs of the growing Church including more meetinghouses, temples, education, humanitarian work and missionary efforts throughout the world. Over many years, a portion is methodically safeguarded through wise financial management and the building of a prudent reserve for the future."

Investments and revenue
As of 2019, EP's holdings purportedly total $100billion, including $40billion-worth of U.S. stock, timberland in the Florida panhandle, and investments in prominent hedge funds such as Bridgewater Associates. Individual shares of stock identified as part of the investment fund reportedly include Apple, Chevron, Visa, JPMorgan Chase, Home Depot, Amazon, and Google. Part of the investments were with Fisher Investments, but some money was pulled after controversial comments from founder Kenneth Fisher. Clarke reports that in recent years the fund has gained about 7% annually.

On November 13, 2019, EP filed a Form 990-T with the Internal Revenue Service for 2018 stating that it is a 501(c)(3) organization, that it recognized $48,295,405 of unrelated business income in 2018, and that it paid $1,108,470 of unrelated business income tax on that income.

Whistleblower complaint
In 2019, The Washington Post reported a whistleblower complaint had been filed with the Internal Revenue Service (IRS) by a former EP employee, David A. Nielsen, that brought national attention to the reported size of the investments. Nielsen was a senior portfolio manager and filed the complaint with his twin brother, Lars. Later reports indicated that Lars approached The Washington Post with the information, and that David was against releasing the information publicly. David released a statement stating "Any public disclosure of information that has been in my possession was unauthorized by me." Peter J. Reilly of Forbes and author Sam Brunson doubt the IRS will take any action.

SEC Investigation and penalty 

On February 21, 2023, the U.S. Securities and Exchange Commission (SEC) publicly charged EP and the LDS Church "for failing to file forms that would have disclosed the Church's equity investments, and for instead filing forms for shell companies that obscured the Church's portfolio and misstated Ensign Peak’s control over the Church’s investment decisions." EP and the LDS Church had failed to file a combined Form 13F from 1997 to 2019, opting instead to use 13 shell LLCs across the United States to file them. 

The SEC report states that "The Church was concerned that disclosure of the assets in the name of Ensign Peak, a known Church affiliate, would lead to negative consequences in light of the size of the Church's portfolio. Ensign Peak did not have the authority to implement this approach without the approval of the Church's First Presidency." The SEC found that EP and the church's portfolio had increased in value from $7 billion to approximately $37.8 billion. In the public statement, Gurbir S. Grewal, director of the SEC's Division of Enforcement, said, "We allege that the LDS Church's investment manager, with the Church's knowledge, went to great lengths to avoid disclosing the Church's investments, depriving the Commission and the investing public of accurate market information. The requirement to file timely and accurate information on Forms 13F applies to all institutional investment managers, including non-profit and charitable organizations.”

As a result of these charges, the SEC penalized EP $4 million and the LDS Church $1 million.

In the church's official statement of this matter, it was explained that the church had worked with the SEC for years to make this settlement. It was openly admitted that the church's senior leadership had been aware of and been legally advised in the creation of the shell LLCs. When asked if EP had failed to comply with SEC regulations, the church simply responded, "We reached resolution with the SEC. We affirm our commitment to comply with the law, regret mistakes made, and now consider this matter closed."

See also
 Finances of The Church of Jesus Christ of Latter-day Saints
 List of wealthiest organizations

References

External links
 ChurchofJesusChrist.org – Official church website

Latter Day Saint practices
Economy and Christianity
Investment management companies of the United States
Companies based in Utah
American companies established in 1997
Privately held companies based in Utah
1997 establishments in Utah